The Apertura 2013 Copa MX Final was the final of the Apertura 2013 Copa MX the third edition of the Copa MX under its current format and 70th overall organized by the Mexican Football Federation, the governing body of association football in Mexico.

The final is contested in a single leg format between two Liga MX clubs, Morelia and Atlas both from group 7. The leg was hosted by Morelia at Estadio Morelos in Morelia, Michoacán on November 5, 2013. The winner earned a spot to face the winner of the Clausura 2014 Copa MX in a playoff to qualify as Mexico 3 to the 2015 Copa Libertadores.

Venue
Due to the tournament's regulations the higher seed among both finalists during the group stage would host the final, thus Estadio Morelos hosted the final. The home venue of Morelia since 1989, it staged four Liga MX finals, one CONCACAF Champions Cup final as well as eight matches of the 2011 FIFA U-17 World Cup.

Background
Atlas, who is a four-time winner last won the tournament back in 1968 while Morelia who have never won the tournament were runners-up back in 1965. For the first time since 1999 Atlas found themselves in final of any kind, the first since losing 5–4 in penalties to the José Cardozo led Toluca in the Verano 1999 league final. This was Morelia's first final of any kind since losing 3–2 on aggregate to UNAM in the Clausura 2011 league final. Atlas last championship of any kind came back in 1968 when they defeated Veracruz to win the 1967–68 Copa Mexico. Morelia's last championship was in 2010 when they defeated Major League Soccer club New England Revolution 2–1 with two goals by Miguel Sabah to capture the 2010 North American SuperLiga, .

Morelia won their first four group stage matches but drew and lost both of its last two matches to Atlas, as they were seeded third, they eliminated León in the quarterfinals and Monterrey in the semi-finals.

Atlas who were the best runners-up during group stage ended with 15 points, the same as final rival Morelia but Morelia had a higher goal differential. Atlas defeated UNAM in the quarterfinals and Ascenso MX club Oaxaca in penalties in the semifinals.

Road to the finals

Note: In all results below, the score of the finalist is given first.

Match

References

Copa MX Finals
2013–14 in Mexican football
Atlético Morelia matches
Atlas F.C. matches
Copa MX Final 2013 Final Apertura